Danetra Shari Moore (born September 15, 1986) is an American urban contemporary gospel artist and musician. She started her music career, in 2012, by performing on Sunday Best on BET. Her first studio album, Light in the Dark, was released on September 11, 2015 by Tyscot Records. This album was her breakthrough release upon the Billboard magazine charts.

Early life
Moore was born, Danetra Shari Moore, on September 15, 1986, in Stockton, California, while she resides in Atlanta, Georgia. She was a singer ever since the age of two and started recording her music at ten years old.

Music career
Her music career started in 2012, with the appearance on BET's reality television signing competition, Sunday Best, where she finished in third place. She released, Light in the Dark, her first studio album, on September 11, 2015, with Tyscot Records. This album was her breakthrough release upon the Billboard magazine charts, where it placed on the Top Gospel Albums chart, peaking at No. 22.

Discography

Studio albums

References

External links
Official website
Tyscot Records profile

1986 births
Living people
African-American songwriters
African-American Christians
Musicians from Stockton, California
Musicians from Atlanta
Songwriters from California
Songwriters from Georgia (U.S. state)
21st-century African-American people
20th-century African-American people